Motive is a Canadian police procedural crime drama television series that aired for four seasons on CTV from February 3, 2013, to August 30, 2016. The series premiere had 1.23 million viewers, making it the number one Canadian series premiere of the 2012–13 season.

Premise 
Motive is a police procedural crime drama set in Vancouver, British Columbia, following the investigations of working class single mother Detective Angie Flynn (Kristin Lehman). Each episode reveals the killer and the victim at the beginning; and the rest of the episode details the ongoing investigation, the killer's efforts to cover up the crime, and, via flashbacks, the events leading to the crime. This format is similar to that of the TV series Columbo.

Episodes

Cast and characters

Main
 Kristin Lehman as Detective Angelika "Angie" Flynn, a feisty Vancouver detective who investigates the motives of killers.
 Louis Ferreira as Detective and later Staff Sergeant Oscar Vega, Flynn's former partner and close friend.
 Brendan Penny as Detective Brian Lucas, originally a rookie detective, by the third season he has come into his own.
 Lauren Holly as Dr. Betty Rogers, the lead medical examiner.
 Valerie Tian as Officer Wendy Sung (season 2), the department's rookie uniformed officer.
 Roger Cross as Staff Sergeant Boyd Bloom (main cast season 1, recurring seasons 2–3), later Superintendent of Investigation.
 Warren Christie as Sergeant Mark Cross (main cast seasons 2–3, recurring season 4), Bloom's replacement as team Commander. Cross and Flynn had an affair ten years previously while he was married, which is revealed during an investigation of a case they worked on at the time.

Recurring
 Cameron Bright as Manny Flynn (seasons 1–2 and 4), Angie's teenage son who later leaves to attend school in order to become a chef.
 Laura Mennell as Samantha Turner (season 2), an attorney and Mark's love interest.
 Victor Garber as Neville Montgomery (season 3), a wealthy businessman.
 Richard de Klerk as Robert Montgomery (season 3), Neville's son who works for him.
 Luisa D'Oliveira as Maria Snow/Sonia Desesso (season 3), who also works for Neville and is engaged to Robert.
 Francis X. McCarthy as Henry Guenther (season 3), Neville's attorney.
 David Lewis as Sergeant Gavin Saunders (seasons 3–4), part of the Internal Affairs department.
 Marci T. House as Police Chief Jennifer Wells (season 4), who is constantly at odds with Oscar as head of Homicide.
 Victor Zinck Jr. as Detective Mitch Kennecki (season 4), who is briefly assigned as Angie's partner.
 Karen LeBlanc as Detective Paula Mazur (season 4), Angie's partner following Kennecki's dismissal from Homicide.
 Tommy Flanagan as Agent Jack Stoker (season 4), a London-based Interpol agent and Angie's love interest.

Production 
On May 31, 2012, CTV ordered 13 episodes from Foundation Features and Lark Productions, to be filmed in Vancouver, British Columbia, from September 17, 2012, to February 26, 2013. The series premiere aired following CTV's broadcast of Super Bowl XLVIII.

On May 21, 2014, CTV ordered a third season of Motive, which premiered on March 8, 2015.

On October 5, 2015, CTV announced that Motive had begun production on the fourth and final season, with star Kristin Lehman directing one of the 13 episodes. Following the events of the third season, Detective Flynn finds herself without a car in the fourth. On April 5, 2016, CTV announced it has partnered with Chevrolet for the final season. Flynn decides on a 2015 Camaro.

Broadcast
Starting in 2013, the series aired for two seasons on ABC in the United States. Following poor second season ratings, ABC did not include Motive on its 2015 summer schedule. In 2016, USA Network picked up Motive for its spring schedule. The third season premiered on April 1, 2016, and concluded on June 26, 2016. The fourth season began airing the following week on July 3, 2016, and concluded on September 25, 2016. The series began airing reruns on G4, which relaunched in the summer of 2021.

Ratings

References

External links 

 
 Motive at USA Network
 

2013 Canadian television series debuts
2016 Canadian television series endings
2010s Canadian crime drama television series
Canadian police procedural television series
CTV Television Network original programming
Detective television series
Super Bowl lead-out shows
Television shows set in Vancouver
Television series by Bell Media
Television series by Universal Television
Television shows featuring audio description
Television shows filmed in Vancouver